DWQA (92.3 FM), broadcasting as DWIZ 92.3, is a radio station owned and operated by Aliw Broadcasting Corporation. Its studio and transmitter are located at the 4th Floor, Fortune Life Bldg., Rizal St., Brgy. Pigcale, Legazpi.

The station was formerly under the Home Radio network from its inception in 2006 to January 16, 2023. On January 30, 2023, it, along with its provincial stations, was relaunched under the DWIZ network.

References 

Aliw Broadcasting Corporation
Home Radio Network
Radio stations in Legazpi, Albay
Radio stations established in 2006